The Ranger Bridge (officially Veterans Memorial Bridge) between Wells River, Vermont and Woodsville, New Hampshire, is a three-hinged steel arch truss bridge over the Connecticut River.  It was built in 1923 to replace a 1917 bridge.   This is the oldest steel arch bridge over the Connecticut River.

History
The Wells River Bridge was built in 1903 to carry rail and road traffic.  In 1917, the road traffic was rerouted over a new bridge, a three-span Warren deck truss designed by John W. Storrs, just downstream, called the Ranger Bridge, for around $65,000 (US$ with inflation).  A flood undermined and destroyed this bridge in 1922.

J. R. Worcester designed the next bridge, which was built by the Boston Bridge Company, the same combination of designer and builder which made the Arch Bridge in Bellows Falls 18 years earlier.  The current bridge was completed in 1923 as a three-hinged steel arch bridge. It was rehabilitated in 2001–3.  This is the oldest steel arch bridge over the Connecticut River.

See also
 
 
 
 List of crossings of the Connecticut River

References

External links

Bridges over the Connecticut River
Woodsville, New Hampshire
Wells River, Vermont
Bridges completed in 1917
Bridges completed in 1923
Bridges in Grafton County, New Hampshire
Bridges in Orange County, Vermont
Road bridges in New Hampshire
Road bridges in Vermont
U.S. Route 2
Bridges of the United States Numbered Highway System
Through arch bridges in the United States
Steel bridges in the United States
1917 establishments in New Hampshire
Buildings and structures in Newbury, Vermont
Interstate vehicle bridges in the United States